The Dror light machine gun (Hebrew for "Sparrow") was an Israeli light machine gun based on the M1941 Johnson light machine gun.

Development

In 1946, Ta'as studied plans to produce an indigenous light machine gun. By the end of the year, the Haganah (precursor to the Israel Defense Forces) bought the manufacturing rights to the M1941 Johnson machine gun from the Winchester Repeating Arms Company and developed the Dror in its own clandestine workshops. They were bought alongside manufacturing tools bought cheaply as scrap in the United States.

Design
The Dror was air-cooled and recoil-operated. The barrel uses a rotary bolt with multiple radial lugs mounted. The Drors is fired from an open-bolt in full auto for better cooling or from a closed-bolt in semi-auto for better accuracy.

The Pattern 1 Drors had a physical resemblance to the Johnson, including the tall front sight and the barrel release.  The Pattern 2 Drors had many changes from the first one by adapting to a rimless round and the use of modified 20-round BAR LMG magazines to balance the weapon. In addition, the barrel release was now located at the front barrel bearing with a heat shield, which is colored orange/brown, that can be removed without the need of using protective gloves. A folding cover is also mounted over the magazine well so that the gunner can close it to prevent dirt and other foul elements from going inside when the weapon is not used.

Production history
Because large amounts of British rifle ammunition were available, the Pattern 1 Dror was initially chambered in .303 British. Around 800–1000 were made before production was halted due to feeding problems the armourers could not handle.

The Pattern 2 Dror was built by IMI and was chambered in 7.92×57mm Mauser to take advantage of large quantities of recently imported Mauser ammunition. In this pattern, the magazines were mounted vertically under the receiver.

Service history
Because of its oversensitivity to dusty environments, the Dror did not see combat service in the 1948–49 1947–1949 War of Independence. Following combat simulation testing, the Israel Defense Forces selected the FN Model D (a derivative of the M1918 Browning Automatic Rifle) to replace the Dror in 1952.

References

Firearms of Israel
Light machine guns
.303 British machine guns
7.92×57mm Mauser machine guns
Weapons and ammunition introduced in 1947